The American Football League Most Valuable Player Award was an award given out by the AFL after voters (AP, UPI, and TSN) voting for that certain player to win AFL MVP.

During the awards ten-year existence (1960–1969), the American Football League's best player for each year was called the "Most Valuable Player" by some sports-news sources and the "Player of the Year" by others.  The awards by the major services are shown below.

Winners

See also
UPI AFL-AFC Player of the Year

References